Mistaria is a genus of in the family Agelenidae (funnel weavers) first described by Pekka T. Lehtinen in 1967.

Species
 the World Spider Catalog accepted the following species:
Mistaria fagei (Caporiacco, 1949) – Kenya
Mistaria jaundea (Roewer, 1955) – Cameroon
Mistaria jumbo (Strand, 1913) – Democratic Republic of the Congo, Rwanda
Mistaria keniana (Roewer, 1955) – Kenya
Mistaria kiboschensis (Lessert, 1915) – Central and East Africa
Mistaria kiwuensis (Strand, 1913) – Democratic Republic of the Congo
Mistaria lawrencei (Roewer, 1955) – Zimbabwe
Mistaria leucopyga (Pavesi, 1883) (type species) – Central and East Africa, Yemen
Mistaria longimamillata (Roewer, 1955) – Mozambique
Mistaria moschiensis (Roewer, 1955) – Tanzania
Mistaria mossambica (Roewer, 1955) – Mozambique
Mistaria nairobii (Caporiacco, 1949) – Central and East Africa
Mistaria nyassana (Roewer, 1955) – Malawi
Mistaria nyeupenyeusi G. M. Kioko & S. Q. Li, 2018 – Kenya
Mistaria teteana (Roewer, 1955) – Mozambique
Mistaria zorica (Strand, 1913) – Central and East Africa
Mistaria zuluana (Roewer, 1955) – South Africa

References

External links

Agelenidae
Araneomorphae genera
Spiders of Africa
Taxa named by Pekka T. Lehtinen